Canemah may refer to:

Canemah, Oregon an early settlement in Oregon, United States, now part of Oregon City
Canemah (sidewheeler), a steamboat named after the town in Oregon